SL may refer to:

Arts and entertainment
 SL (rapper), a rapper from London
 Second Life, a multi-user 3D virtual world
 Sensei's Library, an Internet site dedicated to the game of Go
 Subdominant leittonwechselklänge
 Leica SL, a mirrorless system camera by Leica Camera AG

Business and organizations 
 Sociedad Limitada, the Spanish version of a private limited company

Politics
 Serbian Left (Srpska levica), a political party in Serbia
 Stronnictwo Ludowe, a defunct Polish political party
 Soyons Libres, a French political party

Transportation and vehicles
 SL Corporation, a Korean auto parts company
 Rio Sul Serviços Aéreos Regionais (IATA code SL), a Brazilian airline
 Salt Lake City Southern Railroad (reporting mark SL)
 Stor-Oslo Lokaltrafikk, a public transport operator in Akershus, Norway
 Storstockholms Lokaltrafik, the public transport operator in Stockholm, Sweden
 Thai Lion Air (IATA airline code SL)
 Mercedes-Benz SL-Class, an automobile

Trade unions
 Association of Social Educators, a trade union in Denmark

Geography 
 Sierra Leone, in West Africa, ISO 3166 code
 Saarland, a state of Germany
 SL postcode area of the United Kingdom
 Sungai Long, in Selangor, Malaysia

Language 
 Sl (digraph), a Latin-script digraph
 Sign language, used by deaf persons
 Slovene language (ISO 639-1 code "sl")

Science, technology, and mathematics

Biology
 Sensu lato, a term used in taxonomy to mean "in the wider sense" of a definition
 Standard length, a common measurement for fish
 Abbreviation for × Sophrolaelia, an orchid genus

Computing
 sl, a humorous command in some Unix-based systems that draws an animation of a steam locomotive, intended to be invoked as a typo of ls
 .sl, the country code top-level domain for Sierra Leone
 SL (complexity), a class of computational complexity
 Scientific Linux, a Linux distribution
 Service Loading, a variant of WAP push method

Mathematics
 SL (complexity), a class of computational complexity
 sl (elliptic function), sine lemniscate function
 Special linear group in mathematics, denoted SLn

Other uses 
 Serjeant-at-law, a former type of barrister in England and Ireland
 Sine loco in bibliographies means that place of publication is unknown

See also

 
 LS (disambiguation)
 SLS (disambiguation)